Manuel Soriano (born 8 December 1945) is a Spanish hurdler. He competed in the men's 400 metres hurdles at the 1972 Summer Olympics.

References

1945 births
Living people
Athletes (track and field) at the 1972 Summer Olympics
Spanish male hurdlers
Olympic athletes of Spain
Place of birth missing (living people)
Mediterranean Games silver medalists for Spain
Mediterranean Games medalists in athletics
Athletes (track and field) at the 1971 Mediterranean Games